Sherwood House may refer to:

Physician Residences of the Irene Byron Tuberculosis Sanatorium, also known as the Draper-Sherwood Houses, Allen County, Indiana
James Noble Sherwood House, Plainwell, Michigan
Gurnee–Sherwood House, Wesley Hills, New York
Sherwood House (Yonkers, New York)
Michael Sherwood House, Greensboro, North Carolina
]